Samuel Ayres Selman (born November 14, 1990) is an American professional baseball pitcher who is a free agent. He has previously played in MLB for the San Francisco Giants, Los Angeles Angels and Oakland Athletics. He played college baseball at Vanderbilt University. He was drafted by the Kansas City Royals in the second round of the 2012 MLB draft.

Amateur career

Selman attended St. Andrew's Episcopal School in Austin, Texas. He was an ABCA/Rawlings All-American and two-time all-conference selection (2008 and 2009).

He was drafted by the Los Angeles Angels of Anaheim in the 14th round of the 2009 Major League Baseball Draft, but did not sign and played college baseball at Vanderbilt University.

Professional career

Kansas City Royals
He was drafted by the Kansas City Royals in the second round of the 2012 Major League Baseball draft, and signed for a signing bonus of $750,000.

Selman pitched in the Royals organization from 2012 through the 2018 season. During his time with them, he played for the AZL Royals, Idaho Falls Chukars, Wilmington Blue Rocks, Northwest Arkansas Naturals, and Omaha Storm Chasers

San Francisco Giants
In February 2019, he signed a minor league contract with the San Francisco Giants. On August 1, 2019, the Giants selected Selman's contract and promoted him to the major leagues. He made his major league debut that day versus the Philadelphia Phillies, pitching one inning in relief. In 2019 with the Giants' AA and AAA affiliates he was a combined 3–2 with a 1.80 ERA in 43 games (1 start) in which he pitched 55 innings and struck out 94 batters (striking out 15.4 batters per 9 innings). In 2019 with the Giants he was 0–0 with a 4.35 ERA in 10 relief appearances in which he pitched 10.1 innings and struck out 10 batters.

In his minor league career through 2019, in 531.1 career innings he averaged 11.3 strikeouts per nine innings.

In 24 games for the Giants in 2020, Selman pitched to a 3.72 ERA with 23 strikeouts in 19.1 innings pitched.

Los Angeles Angels
On July 30, 2021, Selman was traded to the Los Angeles Angels along with Ivan Armstrong and José Marte in exchange for Tony Watson. In 18 appearances for the Angels, Selman struggled to a 6.35 ERA with 11 strikeouts in 17.0 innings pitched. On December 1, the Angels designated Selman for assignment. However, Selman remained in DFA limbo for over 3 months after the 2021-22 Major League Baseball lockout froze transactions until March 10, 2022.

Oakland Athletics
On March 13, 2022, Selman was claimed off waivers by the Oakland Athletics. On April 7, Selman was designated for assignment by the Athletics, and sent outright to the Triple-A Las Vegas Aviators on April 11. On April 18, 2022, Selman was added to the Athletics roster as a COVID-related substitute. Selman pitched  scoreless innings with five strikeouts against the Texas Rangers in his only appearance before being returned to Triple-A on April 23. The Athletics promoted Selman back to the major leagues on May 29. He elected free agency on November 10, 2022.

References

External links

Vanderbilt Commodores bio

1990 births
Living people
Baseball players from Austin, Texas
Major League Baseball pitchers
San Francisco Giants players
Los Angeles Angels players
Oakland Athletics players
Vanderbilt Commodores baseball players
Arizona League Royals players
Idaho Falls Chukars players
Wilmington Blue Rocks players
Northwest Arkansas Naturals players
Omaha Storm Chasers players
Richmond Flying Squirrels players
Sacramento River Cats players
Peoria Javelinas players